Neavella is a genus of horse flies in the family Tabanidae.

Species
Neavella albipectus (Bigot, 1859)
Neavella madagascariensis Chainey & Timmer, 1986
Neavella nerstraeteni Leclercq, 1982
Neavella notopleuralis Oldroyd, 1954
Neavella producticornis (Austen, 1912)
Neavella verstraeteni Leclercq, 1981

References

Tabanidae
Diptera of Africa
Taxa named by Harold Oldroyd
Brachycera genera